is the 18th single by Japanese singer-songwriter Mariya Takeuchi. Written by Takeuchi and produced by Tatsuro Yamashita, the single was released through Moon Records on September 12, 1989.

Background 
"Single Again" was used as the eighth opening theme of NTV's . The song is about a woman's feelings when she hears rumors of a divorced man marrying another woman, thus making her feel "single again".

Chart performance 
"Single Again" peaked at No. 2 on Oricon's weekly singles chart. It was certified platinum by the RIAJ in May 1992.

Track listing

Charts

Certification

Cover versions 
 Kaori Kozai covered the song on her 1990 compilation album Koibune: Best Hits.
 Sammi Cheng covered the song in Cantonese as "Líbié" (離別, "Parting") on her 1990 album Sammi.
 Rodel Naval interpolate the song in Tagalog as "Lumayo Ka Man" in 1990.
 Grasshopper covered the song in Cantonese as "Yuánliàng wǒ shì wǒ" (原諒我是我, "Forgive Me for Being Myself") on their 1993 album Shìjiè huì biàn dé hěn měi (世界會變得很美, The World Will Become Beautiful). They also recorded the song in Mandarin as "Wùhuì" (誤會, "Misunderstanding") on their 1994 album Ànliàn de dàijià (暗戀的代價, The Price of Secret Love).
 Akina Nakamori covered the song on her 2002 cover album Zero Album: Utahime 2.
 Phoebe Snow covered the song in English on the 2002 tribute album Sincerely: Mariya Takeuchi Songbook.
 Hideaki Tokunaga covered the song on his 2006 cover album Vocalist 2.
 Yasushi Nakanishi covered the song on his 2007 cover album Standards.
 Yūji Nakada covered the song on his 2014 cover album Song Composite.
 Juju covered the song on her 2014 cover album Request II''.

References

External links 
 
 
 

1989 songs
1989 singles
Japanese-language songs
Japanese television drama theme songs
Mariya Takeuchi songs
Warner Music Japan singles